Hazırım (I'm Ready) is Candan Erçetin's debut studio album. It was released in 1996. The album mainly has a Thracian and Macedonian sound. Most of the lyrics were written by Mete Özgencil.

Track listing

References

Candan Erçetin albums
1996 debut albums